Bienvenido Jiménez (born March 22, 1890, in Cienfuegos – death date unknown) was a Cuban baseball second baseman in the Cuban League and Negro leagues. He played from 1912 to 1929 with several clubs, including Habana, the Cuban Stars (West), and the Cuban Stars (East). Jiménez was nicknamed "Hooks", "Gambeta", and "Pata Joroba". He was elected to the Cuban Baseball Hall of Fame in 1951.

References

External links
 and Baseball-Reference Black Baseball stats and Seamheads

1890 births
Cuban League players
Cuban Stars (East) players
Cuban Stars (West) players
Habana players
San Francisco Park players
Cuban baseball players
Year of death unknown
People from Cienfuegos